The First Secretary of the South Ossetian regional branch of the Communist Party of the Soviet Union was the position of highest authority in the South Ossetian AO in the Georgian SSR of the Soviet Union. The position was created in June 1918, and abolished in August 1991. The First Secretary was a de facto appointed position usually by the Politburo or the General Secretary himself.

List of First Secretaries of the Communist Party of South Ossetia

See also
South Ossetian Autonomous Oblast

Notes

Sources
 World Statesmen.org

Politics of South Ossetia
Political organisations based in South Ossetia
Regional Committees of the Communist Party of Georgia (Soviet Union)
1918 establishments in Russia
1991 disestablishments in the Soviet Union